The Delaware Mountain Formation is a geologic formation in the Delaware Mountains of Texas. It preserves fossils dating back to the Permian period.

See also

 List of fossiliferous stratigraphic units in Texas
 Paleontology in Texas

References
 

Permian geology of Texas